J J Cahill Memorial High School (abbreviated as JJCMHS; colloquially known as JJ) is a public co-educational secondary day school, located on Sutherland Street in Mascot, an inner southern suburb of Sydney, New South Wales, Australia. 

The school is operated by the NSW Department of Education with students from Year 7 to Year 12. The school was established in 1961 as a comprehensive high school, named in honour of John Joseph Cahill, the local member and Premier of New South Wales.

History
In the late 1950s, as a result of lobbying from the local council, residents and the local member for Cook's River and premier, John Joseph (J. J.) Cahill, it was decided to establish a high school in Mascot. Owing to delays in construction, the school was not finished until 1961, two years after Cahill's death in office in October 1959. 

At the time, the first few intakes of the new high school were housed at Gardeners Road Public School. When the school finally was ready for use, the students carried their books and furniture to the new school site down the road, an event which was commemorated at the school's 50th anniversary in 2011. In memory of Cahill's efforts to bring public education to the local area, the school decided that it was to be named in his honour. Accordingly, "J J Cahill Memorial High School" was officially opened by his widow, Esmey Cahill, on 24 March 1961. The first Principal was Landolf (Len) George Schmidt.

Following a financial contribution of $3 million from the Sydney Ports Corporation as part of the Port Botany Development Project, the school built a new gymnasium, which was officially opened on 7 May 2010 by Premier Kristina Keneally in the presence of the principal Robyn Cowin and the Minister for Ports and Waterways, Paul McLeay.

Principals

Notable alumni and staff
Ron Hoenig – Member of the Legislative Assembly for Heffron, barrister and Mayor of the City of Botany Bay (1981–2012)

Christine Robertson – Member of Legislative Council of New South Wales (2003–2011)
John Sutton – rugby league player for South Sydney Rabbitohs

Staff
Anne Slattery  – Head Teacher History and Languages, Councillor of the City of Botany Bay (1989–2012).

See also

 List of government schools in Sydney
 Education in Australia

References

External links
 
 New South Wales Department of Education – J J Cahill Memorial High School

Mascot, New South Wales
Public high schools in Sydney
Educational institutions established in 1961
1961 establishments in Australia